Neriman Özsoy (born 13 July 1988) is a Turkish volleyball player.

Career

She played for Eczacıbaşı Zentiva, DYO Karşıyaka in Turkey and VC Uralochka in Russia and played for Despar Perugia and after then she signed one-year loan to Atom Trefl Sopot in Poland.

Awards

National team
 2009 European League –  Silver Medal
 2010 European League –  Bronze Medal
 2011 European League –  Silver Medal
 2011 European Championship – 
 2012 FIVB World Grand Prix –

Clubs
 2004–05 Turkish Championship –  Runner-Up, with Eczacıbaşı
 2005-06 Turkish Championship –  Champion, with Eczacıbaşı
 2007-08 Turkish Championship –  Champion, with Eczacıbaşı
 2008-09 Turkish Cup –  Champion, with Eczacıbaşı
 2008-09 Turkish Championship –  Runner-Up, with Eczacıbaşı
 2009-10 Turkish Championship –  Bronze Medal with Eczacıbaşı
 2010–11 Polish Championship –  Runner-Up, with Atom Trefl Sopot
 2012 Turkish Volleyball Super Cup –  Runner-Up, with Galatasaray Daikin
 2012-2013 Turkish Women's Volleyball Cup –  Bronze Medal with Galatasaray Daikin

See also
Turkish women in sports

References

External links

Eczacibasi Zentiva Official Web Page
Trefl Sopot Official Web Page

1988 births
Living people
Bulgarian Turks in Turkey
Bulgarian emigrants to Turkey
People from Razgrad
Turkish women's volleyball players
Eczacıbaşı volleyball players
Karşıyaka volleyballers
Turkish expatriate volleyball players
Turkish expatriate sportspeople in Russia
Turkish expatriate sportspeople in Poland
Turkish expatriate sportspeople in Italy
Turkish expatriate sportspeople in Japan
Expatriate volleyball players in Italy
Expatriate volleyball players in Japan
Expatriate volleyball players in Poland
Expatriate volleyball players in Russia
Galatasaray S.K. (women's volleyball) players
Olympic volleyball players of Turkey
Volleyball players at the 2012 Summer Olympics
European Games gold medalists for Turkey
European Games medalists in volleyball
Volleyball players at the 2015 European Games